Martin Sean Indyk (born July 1, 1951) is an American diplomat and foreign relations analyst with expertise in the Middle East. He was a distinguished fellow in International Diplomacy and later executive vice president at the Brookings Institution in Washington, D.C from 2001-2018. He took leave from the Brookings Institution to serve as the U.S. Special Envoy for Israeli–Palestinian Negotiations from 2013 to 2014. He is currently a distinguished fellow at the Council on Foreign Relations.

Indyk served twice as United States ambassador to Israel and also as Assistant Secretary of State for Near East Affairs during the Clinton Administration.

Biography
Martin Indyk was born in 1951 in London, United Kingdom, to a Jewish family who had immigrated from Poland. His family moved to Australia, where he was raised, growing up in the Sydney suburb of Castlecrag. His older brother is the Australian academic and publisher Ivor Indyk.

He graduated from the University of Sydney in 1972. During the 1973 Yom Kippur War, Indyk spent time volunteering in a kibbutz in southern Israel, an experience he has called "a defining moment in my life." He stated he had even considered immigrating to Israel at the time. He returned to graduate school and received a PhD in international relations from the Australian National University in 1977. He married Jill Collier, with whom he had two children, Sarah and Jacob. They have divorced.

Indyk immigrated to the United States by 1982 and started work with a lobbying group in Washington, DC. He became a naturalized U.S. citizen in 1993 a week before joining the United States National Security Council. Indyk is a Reform Jew.

Political and diplomatic career
In 1982, Indyk began working as a deputy research director for the American Israel Public Affairs Committee (AIPAC), a pro-Israel lobbying group in Washington.  From 1985 Indyk served eight years as the founding Executive Director of the Washington Institute for Near East Policy, a research institute specializing in analysis of Middle East policy.

He has been an adjunct professor at the Johns Hopkins School of Advanced International Studies, where he taught Israeli politics and foreign policy. Indyk has also taught at the Middle East Institute at Columbia University, the Moshe Dayan Center for Middle Eastern and African Studies at Tel Aviv University, and the Department of Politics at Macquarie University in Sydney, Australia. Indyk has published widely on U.S. policy toward the Arab–Israeli peace process, on U.S.–Israeli relations, and on the threats to Middle East stability posed by Iraq and Iran.

He served as special assistant to President Bill Clinton and as senior director of Near East and South Asian Affairs at the United States National Security Council. While at the NSC, he served as principal adviser to the President and the National Security Advisor on Arab–Israeli issues, Iraq, Iran, and South Asia. He was a senior member of Secretary of State Warren Christopher's Middle East peace team and served as the White House representative on the U.S. Israel Science and Technology Commission.

He served two stints as United States Ambassador to Israel, from April 1995 to September 1997, and from January 2000 to July 2001. He was the first and so far, the only, foreign-born US ambassador to Israel.

He has served on the board of the New Israel Fund. Indyk currently serves on the Advisory Board for DC based non-profit America Abroad Media.

On July 29, 2013, Indyk was appointed by President Barack Obama as Washington's special Middle East envoy for the resumption of peace talks between Israel and the Palestinian Authority. Both Israeli Prime Minister Benjamin Netanyahu and Palestinian President Mahmoud Abbas favored his appointment. He resigned from this position June 27, 2014, returning to the Brookings Institution as its vice president and director for foreign policy. In 2018, he left Brookings for the Council on Foreign Relations.

Controversy
In 2000, Indyk was placed under investigation by the FBI after allegations arose that he improperly handled sensitive material by using an unclassified laptop computer on an airplane flight to prepare his memos of meetings with foreign leaders. There was no indication that any classified material had been compromised, and no indication of espionage.

Indyk was "apparently ... the first serving U.S. ambassador to be stripped of government security clearance." The Los Angeles Times reported that "veteran diplomats complained that Indyk was being made a scapegoat for the kinds of security lapses that are rather common among envoys who take classified work home from the office." Indyk's clearance was suspended but was reinstated the next month, "for the duration of the current crisis," given "the continuing turmoil in Israel, the West Bank and Gaza [Strip] and for compelling national security reasons."

Criticism

Receiving donations from Qatar
In 2014, Indyk came under scrutiny when a New York Times investigation revealed that wealthy Gulf state of Qatar made a $14.8 million, four-year donation to Brookings Institution, in order to fund two Brookings initiatives, the Brookings Center in Doha and the Project on U.S. Relations with the Islamic World. The Times investigation found that Brookings was one of more than a dozen influential Washington think tanks and research organizations that "have received tens of millions of dollars from foreign governments in recent years while pushing United States government officials to adopt policies that often reflect the donors' priorities." A number of scholars interviewed by the Times expressed alarm at the trend, saying that the "donations have led to implicit agreements that the research groups would refrain from criticizing the donor governments."

The revelation of the think tank's choice to accept the payment from Qatar was especially controversial because at the time, Indyk was acting as a peace negotiator between Israel and the Palestinians, and because Qatar funds jihadist groups in the Middle East and is the main financial backer of Hamas, "the mortal enemy of both the State of Israel and Mahmoud Abbas' Fatah party." Hamas political chief Khaled Meshaal, who directs Hamas's operations against Israel, is also harbored by Qatar. Indyk defended the arrangement with Qatar, contending that it did not influence the think tank's work and that "to be policy-relevant, we need to engage policy makers." However, the arrangement between Qatar and Brookings caused Israeli government officials to doubt Indyk's impartiality.

Of views on Israel
Indyk's career has "featured two abiding, and at times competing, characteristics: his support for Israel, and his disdain for Israel's West Bank settlement activity." Indyk's views "have irked both Israel and the Palestinians at various times."

Isi Leibler criticized Indyk in a 2010 Jerusalem Post op-ed, calling him a "anti-Israel apologist." In 2014, Ha'aretz reported that "Indyk is being identified in Jerusalem as the anonymous source" in an article by  Nahum Barnea  of the Yedioth Ahronoth, 'in which unnamed American officials blamed Israel for the failure of the peace talks." The anonymous source in Yediot Acharonot was quoted as saying: "The Jewish people are supposed to be smart; it is true that they’re also considered a stubborn nation. You're supposed to know how to read the map: In the 21st century, the world will not keep tolerating the Israeli occupation. The occupation threatens Israel's status in the world and threatens Israel as a Jewish state...The Palestinians are tired of the status quo. They will get their state in the end – whether through violence or by turning to international organizations." The remarks angered Israeli officials.

Media appearances
While promoting his book, Innocent Abroad: An Intimate Account of American Peace Diplomacy, on 8 January 2009, Indyk engaged in a discussion of Israeli–Palestinian peace negotiations with Norman Finkelstein of Democracy Now!. Indyk indicated he felt "sandbagged" by not being informed "that I was going to be in some kind of debate with Norman Finkelstein. I’m not interested in doing that. I’m also not here as a spokesman for Israel".

Books
Innocent Abroad: An Intimate Account of American Peace Diplomacy in the Middle East. 2009. Simon & Schuster
Bending History: Barack Obama's Foreign Policy, Brookings Institution Press, February 3, 2012
Master of the Game: Henry Kissinger and the Art of Middle East Diplomacy, Knopf, October 26, 2021

References

External links
Martin S. Indyk, Brookings Institution

 The Middle East Isn’t Worth It Anymore

1951 births
Living people
American Israel Public Affairs Committee
Jewish American academics
English emigrants to Australia
English Jews
Jewish American government officials
Australian emigrants to the United States
The Washington Institute for Near East Policy
Ambassadors of the United States to Israel
United States Special Envoys
Assistant Secretaries of State for the Near East and North Africa
Center on International Cooperation
21st-century American Jews
Brookings Institution people